Natalie Geisenberger (born 5 February 1988) is a German luger. Widely regarded as one of the greatest lugers of all time, she is a nine-time World champion and six-time Olympic champion.

Career
She became Olympic Champion in the women's singles event and in the team relay at the 2014 Winter Olympics in Sochi and at the 2018 Winter Olympics in Pyeongchang and won a bronze medal in the women's singles event at the 2010 Winter Olympics in Vancouver. She subsequently won another individual gold at the 2022 Winter Olympics, becoming the only woman luger ever to win three individual Olympic gold medals. She is the most successful and decorated female Olympic luger, with five gold medals and one bronze.

Geisenberger has won a total of seven gold, six silver, and one bronze medals at the FIL European Luge Championships. She has also accrued sixteen medals at the FIL World Luge Championships, including nine gold, five silver, and two bronze. She is the most decorated and most successful female luger in championship history.

After four consecutive seasons finishing second in the overall classification of the Luge World Cup, she finally won her first title in the 2012–13 season after completing an outstanding scoreboard with six wins and three-second places. She has won a total of 7 world cups in singles and 3 in sprint, both of which are an all-time record in women's competitions.

After missing the 2019–20 season because she was having a baby, Geisenberger resumed competing and won the 2020–21 Luge World Cup.

Personal life
At age six, her family moved to the city of Miesbach, where Gert Schabbehard of the local Club RRT Miesbach introduced her to the sport at age 10. After a very successful junior career in which she won 14 Junior World Cup competitions and three Junior World Championships, she was promoted to the senior German team. Her first senior competition was on 20 January 2007 at the Altenberg, Germany World Cup, where she came in second.

Geisenberger is currently a police officer within the German Federal Police at the Sports School in Bad Endorf.

On 1 June 2018, she married Markus Scheer in Schliersee.

In October 2019, she announced that she would not race in 2019–20 season due to pregnancy. She gave birth to her son Leo in May 2020. In July 2022, she announced that she was pregnant for a second time and subsequently would be missing 2022-23 season.

References

External links
 

1988 births
Living people
Sportspeople from Munich
German female lugers
Lugers at the 2010 Winter Olympics
Lugers at the 2014 Winter Olympics
Lugers at the 2018 Winter Olympics
Lugers at the 2022 Winter Olympics
Olympic gold medalists for Germany
Olympic bronze medalists for Germany
Olympic lugers of Germany
Olympic medalists in luge
Medalists at the 2010 Winter Olympics
Medalists at the 2014 Winter Olympics
Medalists at the 2018 Winter Olympics
Medalists at the 2022 Winter Olympics
21st-century German women